Morley Isaac Griswold (October 10, 1890 – October 3, 1951) was an American politician. He was the 16th governor of Nevada. He was a member of the Republican Party.

Biography
Griswold was born near Lamoille, Nevada on October 10, 1890.  He graduated from the University of Michigan in 1913, and received his law degree from the University of Michigan Law School in 1915.

He practiced law in Reno.  A Republican, he served as Reno City Attorney from 1915 to 1926. Griswold served in the U.S. Army during World War I.

He was the 16th lieutenant governor of Nevada from 1927 to 1934. He became the governor of Nevada upon the death of Governor Frederick Balzar on March 21, 1934.  Unsuccessful in his election bid, he left office in January 1935.

Griswold died on October 3, 1951 in Reno, Nevada, at the age of 60.

References

External links
Morley Isaac Griswold at National Governors Association

1890 births
1951 deaths
Republican Party governors of Nevada
Lieutenant Governors of Nevada
Military personnel from Nevada
Nevada lawyers
People from Elko, Nevada
University of Michigan Law School alumni
20th-century American politicians
20th-century American lawyers